Chen Zhen may refer to:

 Chen Zhen (Three Kingdoms), Shu Han minister in the Three Kingdoms period
 Chen Zhen (character), fictional Chinese martial artist
 Chen Zhen (artist) (陈箴; 1955–2000), Chinese-French artist
 Chen Zhen (handballer) (born 1963), Chinese Olympic handball player